Guxian (古县) primarily refers to Gu County, Shanxi, People's Republic of China (PRC).

It may also refer to numerous smaller locations in the PRC:

 Guxian Dam (故县水库), dam on the Luo River in Luoning County, Henan

Township-level divisions 
 Guxian (古县镇), town in Yongfeng County, Ji'an Jiangxi
 Guxian (古县镇), town in Qi County, Jinzhong, Shanxi
 Guxian Township, Hejian (故仙乡), Hebei
 Guxian Township, Xingtai (固献乡), in Wei County, Xingtai, Hebei
 Guxian, Tongbai County (固县镇), town in Henan
 Guxian, Yanshi (顾县镇), town in Henan
 Guxian Township, Henan (古贤乡), in Tangyin County
 Guxian Township, Pu County (古县乡), Shanxi
 Guxian Township, Qinshui County (固县乡), Shanxi
Written as "故县":
 Guxian Subdistrict, Jiaoqu, Changzhi, Shanxi
 Guxian, Lingbao, town in Henan
 Guxian, Luoning County, town in Henan
 Guxian, Qin County, town in Shanxi
 Guxian Township, Wuxiang County, Shanxi